Thomas Gotobed McMullen (January 7, 1844 – October 7, 1925) was a lumber merchant and political figure in Nova Scotia, Canada. He represented Colchester County in the Nova Scotia House of Assembly from 1897 to 1901 as a Liberal-Conservative member.

He was the son of Hugh McMullen and Rebecca Gotobed. McMullen was married twice: to Jessie McConnell in 1867 and then to a widow named Norris. He was leading principal of the Midland Railway, which was later purchased by the Dominion Atlantic Railway. McMullen died in Truro at the age of 81.

References 
 A Directory of the Members of the Legislative Assembly of Nova Scotia, 1758-1958, Public Archives of Nova Scotia (1958)

1844 births
1925 deaths
Progressive Conservative Association of Nova Scotia MLAs
Mayors of places in Nova Scotia